Giacobbe "Jake" LaMotta (July 10, 1922 – September 19, 2017) was an American professional boxer who was world middleweight champion between 1949 and 1951. Nicknamed "The Bronx Bull" or "Raging Bull", LaMotta was a rough fighter who was not a particularly big puncher, but would subject his opponents to vicious beatings in the ring. With the use of constant stalking, brawling and inside fighting, he developed a reputation for being a "bully"; he was what is often referred to today as a swarmer and a slugger.

Due to his hard style of fighting, LaMotta often took as much as he dished out in an era of great middleweights. With a thick skull and jaw muscles, LaMotta was able to absorb incredible amounts of punishment over the course of his career, and is thought to have one of the greatest chins in boxing history. LaMotta's six-fight rivalry with Sugar Ray Robinson was one of the most notable in the sport. Although each fight was close and LaMotta dropped Robinson to the canvas multiple times, LaMotta won only one of the bouts. LaMotta, who lived a turbulent life in and out of the ring, was managed by his brother Joey. He was ranked 52nd on Ring Magazines list of the "80 Best Fighters of the Last 80 Years", and also ranked amongst its list of the 10 greatest middleweights of all time. LaMotta was inducted into the International Boxing Hall of Fame in the inaugural class of 1990.

LaMotta's autobiography was adapted into the 1980 Martin Scorsese film Raging Bull. It went on to be nominated for eight Academy Awards, with Robert De Niro winning Best Actor for his portrayal of LaMotta.

Early life
LaMotta was born on the Lower East Side of New York City on July 10, 1922, to Italian parents, Elizabeth (Merluzzo) and Joseph LaMotta. Many sources had reported his year of birth as 1921, but his daughter Christi said in a Facebook post immediately following his death that it was in fact 1922. His mother was born in the United States to Italian immigrants, while his father was an immigrant from Messina, Sicily, who came with family including his brother Joseph. The family lived briefly in Philadelphia before returning to New York and settling in the Bronx.

Jake's father forced the boy to fight other boys in order to entertain neighborhood adults, who threw pocket change into the ring. LaMotta's father collected the money and used it to help pay the rent. One of LaMotta's cousins on his father's side was Richard LaMotta, who became an entrepreneur and creator of the Chipwich ice cream treat.

LaMotta learned to box while in a reformatory in upstate New York, where he'd been sent for attempted robbery. Afterward he fought undefeated in amateur bouts, turning professional at age 19 in 1941. During World War II, he was rejected for military service due to a childhood mastoid operation on one of his ears which affected his hearing.

Boxing career
As a middleweight in his first fifteen bouts, LaMotta went 14–0–1 (3 KOs) before losing a highly controversial split decision to Jimmy Reeves in Reeves' hometown of Cleveland, Ohio. Chaos erupted after the decision was announced. Fights broke out around the ring and the crowd continued to boo for 20 minutes. The arena's organist tried (but failed) to calm down the crowd by playing the "Star Spangled Banner".

One month later, LaMotta and Reeves fought again in the same arena. LaMotta lost a much less controversial decision. A third match between the two took place on March 19, 1943, in Detroit, Michigan. The first five rounds were close, though Reeves was struggling in the fourth. In the sixth round, LaMotta floored Reeves, who was only down for a second. Once the fight resumed, LaMotta landed a left on Reeves' chin, sending him down face-first. Reeves was blinking his eyes and shaking his head as the referee counted him out.

LaMotta vs. Robinson I–V
LaMotta fought Sugar Ray Robinson in Robinson's middleweight debut at Madison Square Garden, New York City, October 2, 1942. LaMotta knocked Robinson down in the first round of the fight. Robinson got up and took control over much of the fight, winning via a unanimous 10-round decision.

A 10-round rematch took place February 5, 1943, at Olympia Stadium in Detroit, Michigan. The eighth round was historic. LaMotta landed a right to Robinson's head and a left to his body, sending him through the ropes. Robinson was saved by the bell at the count of nine. LaMotta, who was already leading on the scorecards before knocking Robinson out of the ring, pummeled and outpointed him for the rest of the fight. Robinson had trouble keeping LaMotta at bay. LaMotta won via unanimous decision, giving Robinson the first defeat of his career.

The victory was short-lived, as the two met on February 26, 1943, in what was another 10-round fight, once again at Olympia Stadium in Robinson's former home of Detroit. Robinson was knocked down for a nine-count in Round 7. Robinson later stated, "He really hurt me with a left in the seventh round. I was a little dazed and decided to stay on the deck." Robinson won the close fight by unanimous decision, using a dazzling left jab and jarring uppercuts. LaMotta said the fight was given to Robinson because he would be inducted into the army the next day.

A fourth fight, the duo's final 10 rounder, took place nearly two years after the third, on February 23, 1945, at Madison Square Garden, New York. Robinson won again by a unanimous decision.

LaMotta and Robinson had their fifth bout at Comiskey Park, Chicago, Illinois on September 26, 1945. Robinson won by a very controversial split decision, contested over 12 rounds. The decision was severely booed by the 14,755 people in attendance. LaMotta later said in his autobiography that the decision was widely criticized by several newspapers and boxing publishers. Robinson said afterward, "This was the toughest fight I've ever had with LaMotta."

LaMotta vs. Fox
On November 14, 1947, LaMotta was knocked out in the fourth round by Billy Fox. Suspecting the fight was fixed, the New York State Athletic Commission withheld purses for the fight and suspended LaMotta. The fight with Fox would come back to haunt him later in life, during a case with the Federal Bureau of Investigation.

In his testimony and in his later book, LaMotta admitted to throwing the fight to gain favor with the Mafia. All involved agreed the fix was obvious and their staging inept.

As LaMotta wrote,
The first round, a couple of belts to his head, and I see a glassy look coming over his eyes. Jesus Christ, a couple of jabs and he's going to fall down? I began to panic a little. I was supposed to be throwing a fight to this guy, and it looked like I was going to end up holding him on his feet... By [the fourth round], if there was anybody in the Garden who didn't know what was happening, he must have been dead drunk.

The thrown fight and a payment of $20,000 to the Mafia got LaMotta his title bout against World Middleweight Champion Marcel Cerdan.

LaMotta vs. Cerdan
LaMotta won the World Middleweight title on June 16, 1949, in Detroit, Michigan, defeating Frenchman Marcel Cerdan. LaMotta won the first round (in which he knocked Cerdan down), Cerdan the second, and the third was even. At that point it became clear something was wrong. Cerdan dislocated his arm in the first round, apparently damaged in the knockdown, and gave up before the start of the 10th round. LaMotta damaged his left hand in the fifth round, but still landed 104 punches in the ninth round, whereas Cerdan hardly threw a punch. The official score had LaMotta as winner by a knockout in 10 rounds because the bell had already rung to begin that round when Cerdan announced he was quitting. A rematch was arranged, but while Cerdan was flying back to the United States to fight the rematch, his Air France Lockheed Constellation crashed in the Azores, killing everyone on board.

World Middleweight Champion
LaMotta made his first title defense against Tiberio Mitri on July 7, 1950, at Madison Square Garden, New York. LaMotta retained his title via unanimous decision. LaMotta's next defense came on September 13, 1950, against Laurent Dauthuille. Dauthuille had previously beaten LaMotta by decision before LaMotta became world champion. By the fifteenth round, Dauthuille was ahead on all scorecards (72–68, 74–66, 71–69) and seemed to be about to repeat a victory against LaMotta. LaMotta hit Dauthuille with a barrage of punches that sent him down against the ropes toward the end of the round. Dauthuille was counted out with 13 seconds left in the fight. This fight was named Fight of the Year for 1950 by The Ring magazine.

Saint Valentine's Day Massacre of boxing

The sixth and final fight between LaMotta and Robinson took place at Chicago Stadium. This fight was scheduled for 15 rounds and was for the middleweight title. Held on February 14, 1951, Saint Valentine's Day, the fight became known as boxing's version of the Saint Valentine's Day Massacre. In the last few rounds, LaMotta began to take a horrible beating and was soon unable to defend himself from Robinson's powerful blows. But LaMotta refused to go down. Robinson won by a technical knockout in the 13th round, when the fight was stopped.

Light heavyweight
LaMotta moved up to light heavyweight after losing his world middleweight title. He had poor results at first. He lost his debut against Bob Murphy, lost a split decision to Norman Hayes, and drew with Gene Hairston in his first three bouts. In his next three fights, LaMotta had rematches with Hayes, Hairston, and Murphy, and defeated all of them by unanimous decision.

On December 31, 1952, LaMotta had his next fight against Danny Nardico. He knocked LaMotta down for the only time in his career (not counting his thrown 1947 fight) by a right hand in the seventh round. LaMotta got up and was beaten against a corner by Nardico until the bell rang. LaMotta's corner stopped the bout before the eighth round began.

Following that fight, LaMotta took time off; when he returned, in early 1954, he knocked out his first two opponents, Johnny Pretzie (TKO 4) and Al McCoy (KO 1), but a controversial split decision loss to Billy Kilgore on April 14, 1954, convinced him to retire.

Post-boxing
After retiring from the ring, LaMotta owned and managed a bar at 1120 Collins Ave in Miami Beach. He also became a stage actor and comedian. In 1958 he was arrested and charged with introducing men to an underage girl at a club he owned in Miami. He was convicted and served six months on a chain gang, although he maintained his innocence.

LaMotta appeared in more than 15 films, including The Hustler (1961) with Paul Newman and Jackie Gleason, in which he had a role as a bartender. He appeared in several episodes of the NBC police comedy Car 54 Where Are You? (1961–63). A lifelong baseball fan, he organized the Jake LaMotta All-Star Team in the Bronx. The LaMotta team played in Sterling Oval which was located between 165th and 164th Streets between Clay and Teller Avenue.

In 1965, LaMotta appeared as "Big Jule" in the New York City Center production of Guys and Dolls for 15 performances alongside Alan King and Jerry Orbach.

In 1960 LaMotta was called to testify before a U.S. Senate sub-committee that was looking into underworld influence on boxing. He testified that he had thrown his bout with Billy Fox so that the mob would arrange a title bout for him.

Fighting style
LaMotta is recognized as having had one of the best chins in boxing. He rolled with punches, minimizing their force and damage when they landed, but he was also able to absorb many blows. In the Saint Valentine's Day Massacre, his sixth bout with Robinson, LaMotta suffered numerous severe blows to the head. Commentators could be heard saying "No man can take this kind of punishment!" But LaMotta did not go down. The fight was stopped by the referee in the 13th round, declaring it a TKO victory for Robinson.

LaMotta was one of the first boxers to adopt the "bully" style of fighting, in that he always stayed close and in punching range of his opponent, by stalking him around the ring, and sacrificed taking punches himself in order to land his own shots. Due to his aggressive, unrelenting style he was known as "The Bronx Bull." He boasted "No son-of-a-bitch ever knocked me off my feet", but that claim was ended in December 1952 at the hands of Danny Nardico when Nardico caught him with a hard right in the seventh round. LaMotta fell into the ropes and went down. After regaining his footing, he was unable to come out for the next round.

Raging Bull: My Story
Raging Bull: My Story is a 1970 second edition of LaMotta's memoir. The autobiographical details include his life as a young teenage criminal; his reformation in prison; his extensive career as an amateur and professional boxer; his struggles with organized crime who kept a boxing title out of reach; and his jealous obsession with his wife, Vikki. The book details his life, from childhood until the end of his fame.

The first edition is:
La Motta, Jake with Carter, Joseph and Savage, Peter (1970). Raging Bull: My Story. Englewood Cliffs, N.J.: Prentice-Hall [1970]. .

Raging Bull

Hollywood executives approached LaMotta with the idea of a movie about his life, based on his 1970 memoir Raging Bull: My Story. The film, Raging Bull, released in 1980, was initially only a minor box office success, but eventually received overwhelming critical acclaim for both director Martin Scorsese and actor Robert De Niro, who gained about 60 pounds during the shooting of the film to play the older LaMotta in later scenes.

To accurately portray the younger LaMotta, De Niro trained with LaMotta until LaMotta felt he was ready to box professionally. De Niro lived in Paris for three months, eating at the finest restaurants in order to gain sufficient weight to portray LaMotta after retirement. De Niro won the Academy Award for Best Actor for his performance.

Later life and death

LaMotta had a troubled personal life, including a spell in a reformatory, and was married seven times. He admitted having raped a woman, having beaten his wives, and coming close to beating a man to death during a robbery.

In February 1998, LaMotta's elder son, Jake LaMotta Jr., died of liver cancer. In September 1998, his younger son, Joseph LaMotta, died in the crash of Swissair Flight 111.

His nephew, John LaMotta, fought in the heavyweight-novice class of the 2001 Golden Gloves championship tournament. John later became an actor, and one of his roles was as "Duke", who ran the bar of that name featured in the television comedy series Frasier. Another nephew, William Lustig, is a well-known director and producer of horror films and the president of Blue Underground, Inc.

LaMotta had four daughters, including Christi by his second wife Vikki LaMotta and Stephanie by his fourth wife Dimitria. He married his seventh wife, his longtime fiancée Denise Baker, on January 4, 2013. LaMotta remained active on the speaking and autograph circuit, and published several books about his career, his life, and his fights with Robinson.

LaMotta appeared in a 50-minute New York stage production, Lady and the Champ, in July 2012. The production focused on LaMotta's boxing career, and was criticized by The New York Times as poorly executed and a "bizarre debacle".

LaMotta is the subject of a documentary directed and produced by Greg Olliver. The film features an appearance by Mike Tyson among other notable athletes, actors and Jake's family and friends. Also in production was a sequel to Raging Bull, although MGM filed suit to halt the project, saying that LaMotta did not have the right to make a sequel. The lawsuit was settled on July 31, 2012, when LaMotta agreed to change the title of the film to The Bronx Bull.

LaMotta: The Bronx Bull stars actor William Forsythe as LaMotta, while Paul Sorvino plays his father. It also features Joe Mantegna, Tom Sizemore, Penelope Ann Miller, Natasha Henstridge, Joey Diaz and Ray Wise.

LaMotta died on September 19, 2017, from complications of pneumonia in a nursing home in Florida, at the age of 95.

Professional boxing record

See also
List of middleweight boxing champions
Bronx Walk of Fame

References

External links

 
 
 Whitney Martin (AP), "Lamotta Near End Of Trail", Lewiston Daily Sun, January 3, 1953
 
 

1922 births
2017 deaths
American people of Italian descent
American male stage actors
American stand-up comedians
International Boxing Hall of Fame inductees
Middleweight boxers
Boxers from New York City
Sportspeople from the Bronx
American male boxers
Deaths from pneumonia in Florida